Liteyny may refer to:

Liteyny Avenue,  Saint Petersburg, Russia
Liteyny Bridge,  Saint Petersburg, Russia
Liteyny Municipal Okrug,  Saint Petersburg, Russia
Liteyny Theatre,  Saint Petersburg, Russia